The Milei (also: Milea or Pârâul Milei) is a left tributary of the river Bâsca in Romania.

References

Rivers of Romania
Rivers of Buzău County